Muslim Kanji (date of birth unknown – 7 March 2010) was a Kenyan first-class cricketer.

Kanji represented Kenya in two editions of the ICC Trophy in 1982 and 1990, making seven appearances. He also made one appearance in first-class cricket for Kenya against the touring Pakistan Starlets at Nairobi in 1986. Batting twice in the match, he was dismissed in the Kenyan first innings for 2 runs by Sajjad Akbar, while in their second innings he was dismissed for the same score by the same bowler. Kanji died in London in March 2010.

References

External links

Date of birth unknown
2010 deaths
Kenyan cricketers